Shahrak-e Darya Sar (also Romanized as Shahrak-e Daryā Sar; also known as Daryā Sar) is a village in Barik Rud Rural District, in the Central District of Fereydunkenar County, Mazandaran Province, Iran. In a 2006 census, its population was 61, in 20 families.

References 

Populated places in Fereydunkenar County